The 2022 Indy Pro 2000 Championship was the 24th season in series history, and the fourth and final season held under the Indy Pro 2000 moniker. It served as the second rung of the Road to Indy ladder system, with the winner earning an Indy Lights scholarship for the following season. Rookie Louis Foster won the Drivers' championship, while Juncos Hollinger Racing won their fifth Teams' championship.

Drivers and teams 
All drivers competed using Tatuus-built racecars, with the halo safety device being incorporated for the first time in 2022.

 Casey Putsch was signed to compete with Legacy Autosport, but neither team nor driver entered any rounds.

Schedule 
The schedule was announced on October 5, 2021, and featured two street courses, five road courses and two ovals.

Race results

Season review

First half 
The fourth Indy Pro 2000 season began with its traditional two rounds on the Streets of St. Petersburg. Josh Green led the field to green after earning the first pole position of the year, quickly creating a gap back to Enaam Ahmed in second and Louis Foster in third. Ahmed worked hard to reduce the gap to Green in the second half of the race, but the latter held on to win on his debut. A day later, it was Nolan Siegel's time to shine. He led from pole, ahead of Wyatt Brichacek and Ahmed, the latter getting overtaken by Braden Eves at the start. Two cautions and subsequent restarts, first for a collision between Salvador de Alba and Reece Gold and then for Ahmed colliding with the wall, helped Foster to rise to second ahead of Eves, but Siegel remained in the lead to win. He left St. Petersburg as the championship leader, two points ahead of Foster.

The championship then headed to Barber Motorsports Park in Alabama, with Gold securing pole for the first race. He led from start to finish, remaining unchallenged throughout a caution-free race, with the only incident being a collision between de Alba and Jack William Miller. Colin Kaminsky came second, ahead of Ahmed and Foster. Siegel claimed pole for race two, leading Eves, while Foster gained three places at the start, rising from sixth to third. He pressured Eves all race long, but the latter remained mistake-free throughout another race without any yellow flags. Siegel became the season's first repeat winner, keeping his championship lead ahead of Foster.

Next up was the Indianapolis Motor Speedway, with a triple-header held on the road course. The weekend started in chaotic fashion when surprise polesitter Jonathan Browne locked up in turn one, producing a slide which collected Foster and Miller, retiring both cars. Eves rose from tenth to second among the chaos, so became the race leader when Browne had to serve a penalty for the incident. He went on to finish first, but was later disqualified in the post-race technical inspection. This promoted de Alba to his first win, ahead of Yuven Sundaramoorthy and Kaminsky. The second race was also filled with incidents, between polesitter Miller and Foster on lap one, the latter receiving a penalty, as well as incidents affecting Jordan Missig, Ahmed and Eves. Gold, who started in fourth, kept his nose clean to eventually win, leading home Kaminsky and Siegel. The final race of the weekend saw Miller start from pole again, with Foster cleanly overtaking him for the lead this time. A caution brought the field back together and led to multiple changes in the order, but Foster held on for his first win, ahead of Eves and Miller. Siegel's relative consistency kept him in the championship lead by a three-point margin, ahead of Foster.

The first oval race of the season was held at Indianapolis Raceway Park. Gold qualified on pole, leading his Juncos teammate Ahmed. Foster started third and began pressuring Ahmed right from the start, with the pass for second coming 45 laps into the race. He then overtook Gold two laps later and built a gap, which was nullified by a caution as Kaminsky brushed the wall. Foster was unchallenged at the restart and led home Gold and Green. This win also earned him the championship lead, 14 points clear of Gold.

The halfway point of the season came at Road America, where Foster continued his run of form. He started the first race in third, but as polesitter Gold ran wide on the first lap, Foster managed to gain the lead. He quickly took off after a brief caution and remained unchallenged until the end. Second place was contested between Eves, de Alba and Green, with the latter eventually succeeding. Ahmed started second, then slipped away at the start and came back to eventually finish third. The second race of the weekend saw Green start from pole, with Eves pressuring and eventually passing him. Miller started seventh, but rose quickly enough to also pass Green and begin attacking Eves, albeit without success. Third place was hotly contested all through the race, with de Alba eventually clinching it. Foster's run came to a sudden end, as an error saw him finish thirteenth. He still remained in the championship lead, though, 19 points ahead of Gold.

Second half 
Foster was back on form in Mid-Ohio, earning pole for both races. He braced two caution periods in the first race as Sundaramoorthy and Browne retired, but no one could stop him. De Alba rose from fifith to third at the start and eventually passed Siegel for second. In the end, Foster was over 14 seconds clear from de Alba and Siegel. The second race was a different story, though, as Kiko Porto passed Foster into turn two on the opening lap. Porto resisted Foster's pressure for the whole race, with the gap never growing beyond a second, and held on for his first win, with Sundaramoorthy in third. Foster played it safe to finish second, boosting his championship lead to 49 points.

Teams and drivers made their return to Canada and to Exhibition Place two weeks later. Foster continued to tighten his grip on the championship, once again clinching two pole positions. Race one saw a flag-to-flag victory by the Englishman, holding of Ahmed at the start and surviving two caution restarts when Browne lost his front wing and de Alba retired. Foster led home Ahmed and Green, who bounced back after crashing in qualifying the day before. Race two started with a multi-car crash in turn one involving five cars and ending Green's race. On the restart, a second caution was immediately called as Browne spun and took out himself as well as Siegel. Foster controlled the second restart and the rest of the race, finishing ahead of Gold in second and Sundaramoorthy, both profiting from a post-race penalty for Missig. Foster took a maximum of 66 points in Toronto and now lead the standings by 63 points, from Gold and Siegel.

The second oval race of the season came next, at World Wide Technology Raceway in St. Louis. De Alba dominated proceedings, leading all test sessions and then qualifying to start from pole. Siegel started fourth and gained to places on the opening lap. The battle for second place then grew to a four-car fight, with Green, Eves and Foster battling it out. In the end, de Alba won in dominating fashion, Siegel managed to hold on to second, and Eves was third after Green ran wide with ten laps remaining. Foster came fourth, further cementing his championship lead, now 77 points ahead of Gold.

The season ended at Portland International Raceway, where Foster once again claimed the first pole position of the weekend. He was challenged by Gold in the opening part of race one, but remained in first place as an incident between Siegel, Porto and Miller promoted Ahmed to third behind the leading pair. Behind him was Marcos Flack, who surprised in just his second race by jumping from 16th on the grid to fourth place in the span of a single lap. Foster's seventh win of the season earned him the championship. Race two saw Gold lead from pole and dominate the race, as Porto slotted into second ahead of Foster at the start. Foster was still battling for second despite having already sealed the championship, and eventually passed Porto, but Gold had pulled out a gap to the rest of the field by then and won the race. The last race of the season saw Gold secure second place in the championship with another win, ahead of Porto and Siegel, who held second and third for the entirety of the race. Ahmed came fourth, thereby securing third place in the standings, just five points ahead of Siegel.

Championship standings

Drivers' Championship 

 Scoring system

 The driver who qualified on pole is awarded one additional point.
 One point was awarded to the driver who leads the most laps in a race.
 One point was awarded to the driver who sets the fastest lap during the race.

Teams' championship 

 Scoring system

 Single car teams received 3 bonus points as an equivalency to multi-car teams
 Only the best two results counted for teams fielding more than two entries

See also 

 2022 IndyCar Series
 2022 Indy Lights
 2022 U.S. F2000 National Championship
 2022 USF Juniors

References

External links 

 Indy Pro 2000 Championship Official Website

2022
Indy Pro 2000 Championship
Indy Pro 2000 Championship
Indy Pro 2000 Championship